The list of marine molluscs of Brazil is a partial list of saltwater species that form a part of the molluscan fauna of Brazil. This list does not include the land or freshwater molluscs. Bounded by the Atlantic Ocean on the east, Brazil has a coastline of 7,491 kilometers (4,655 mi), where most species listed herein can be found.

Gastropoda 
List of marine gastropods:

Heterobranchia
Family Acteonidae
Acteon mirim C. Cunha, 2011
Acteon pelecais Ev. Marcus, 1972
Crenilabium birmani Simone, 2006
Mysouffa cumingii (A.Adams, 1854)

Family Amathinidae
Iselica globosa (H. C. Lea, 1843)

Family Aplysiidae
Aplysia brasiliana Rang, 1828
Aplysia dactylomela (Rang, 1828)
Aplysia fasciata Poiret, 1789
Aplysia juliana (Quoy & Gaimard, 1832)

Family Architectonicidae

Architectonica nobilis Röding, 1798
Heliacus cylindricus (Gmelin, 1791)
Heliacus bisulcatus (Orbigny, 1845)
Pseudotorinia architae (Costa, 1841)
Pseudotorinia phorcysi Cavallari, Salvador & Simone, 2014
Psilaxis clertoni Tenório, Barros,Francisco & Silva, 2011
Psilaxis krebsii (Mörch, 1875)
Solatisonax cabrali Tenório, Barros,Francisco & Silva, 2011
Solatisonax rudigerbieleri Tenório, Barros,Francisco & Silva, 2011
Spirolaxis centrifuga (Monterosato, 1890)
Spirolaxis lamellifer (Rehder, 1935)

Littorinimorpha
Family Barleeidae
Caelatura pernambucensis (Watson, 1885)

Family Calyptraeidae
Bostrycapulus odites Collin, 2005
Calyptraea centralis (Conrad, 1841)
Crepidula carioca Simone, 2006
Crepidula intratesta Simone, 2006
Crepidula protea d'Orbigny, 1841
Crepidula pyguaya Simone, 2006

Family Littorinidae

 Echinolittorina lineolata (d'Orbigny, 1840)
 Littoraria angulifera (Lamarck, 1822)
 Littoraria flava (King & Broderip, 1832)

Family Personidae
Distorsio clathrata (Lamarck, 1816)
Distorsio perdistorta Fulton, 1938

Family Strombidae

 Aliger gallus (Linnaeus, 1758)
 Macrostrombus costatus  (Gmelin, 1791)
 Strombus pugilis (Linnaeus, 1758)
 Titanostrombus goliath (Schröter, 1805) - endemic to Brazil
 Tricornis raninus (Gmelin, 1791)

Neogastropoda
Family Ancillariidae

Amalda josecarlosi Pastorino, 2003
Ancilla faustoi H. R. Matthews, H. C. Matthews & Muniz Dijck, 1979
Ancilla matthewsi J. Q. Burch & R. L. Burch, 1967
Eburna lienardii (Bernardi, 1859)

Family Bursidae
Bursa corrugata (G. Perry, 1811)
Bursa natalensis Coelho & Matthews, 1970
Bursa grayana Dunker, 1862
Bursa granularis (Röding, 1798)
Bursa ranelloides Reeve, 1844
Marsupina bufo (Bruguière, 1792)

Family Cancellariidae
Microcancilla brasiliensis (Verhecken, 1991) 
Microcancilla phoenix Souza, Pimenta & Miyaji, 2021

Family Cassidae

Casmaria atlantica Clench, 1944
Cassis tuberosa (Linnaeus, 1758)
Cypraecassis testiculus (Linnaeus, 1758)
Semicassis granulata (Born, 1778)
Semicassis labiata (Carcelles, 1953)

Family Marginellidae
 Bullata analuciae de Souza & Coovert, 2001
 Bullata bullata (Born, 1778)
 Bullata guerrinii de Souza & Coovert, 2001
 Bullata largillieri (Kiener, 1834)
 Bullata lilacina (Sowerby II, 1846)
 Bullata mathewsi (van Mol & Tursch, 1967)
Eratoidea scalaris (Jousseaume, 1875) 
Leptegouana tripartita (Cossignani, 2006)
Prunum fulminatum (Kiener, 1841)
Prunum rubens (Martens, 1881)
Volvarina brasiliana Boyer, 2000

Family Melongenidae
 Pugilina tupiniquim Abbate & Simone, 2015

Family Muricidae
Chicoreus brevifrons (Lamarck, 1822)
Chicoreus spectrum (Reeve, 1846)
Coronium coronatum (Penna-Neme & Leme, 1978)
Coronium elegans Simone, 1996
Coronium oblongum Simone, 1996
Dermomurex oxum Petuch, 1979
Leptotrophon atlanticus Pimenta, Couto & Costa, 2008
Phyllonotus oculatus Reeve, 1845
Pterynotus havanensis Vokes, 1970
Stramonita brasiliensis Claremont & D. G. Reid, 2011
Stramonita rustica (Lamarck, 1822)
Siratus senegalensis (Gmelin, 1791)

Family Pisaniidae

Anna capixaba Coltro & Dornellas, 2013
Engina goncalvesi Coltro, 2005
Engina janowskyi Coltro, 2005
Gemophos auritulus (Link, 1807)
Hesperisternia karinae (Usticke, 1953)
Monostiolum atlanticum (Coelho, Matthews & Cardoso, 1970)
Pisania pusio (Linnaeus, 1758)

Family Tonnidae

Malea noronhensis Kempf & Matthews, 1969
Tonna galea (Linnaeus, 1758)
Tonna pennata (Morch, 1853)

Family Turbinellidae

 Vasum cassiforme (Kiener, 1841)
 Turbinella laevigata Anton, 1839
 Fulgurofusus sarissophorus (Watson, 1882)
 Fulgurofusus ecphoroides Harasewych, 1983
 Fugurofusus coronatus (Penna-Neme & Leme, 1978)

Unassigned Caenogastropoda
Family Abyssochrysidae
Abyssochrysos brasilianus Bouchet, 1991

Family Cerithiidae
 Bayericerithium bayeri Petuch, 2001
 Cerithium atratum (Born, 1778)
 Ittibittium oryza (Mörch, 1876)

Family Litiopidae
 Alaba incerta (d’Orbigny, 1841)
 Litiopa melanostoma Rang, 1829

Family Modulidae
 Modulus modulus (Linnaeus, 1758)

Family Nystiellidae
Opaliopsis atlantis (Clench & Turner, 1952)
Opaliopsis cearense Andrade, Costa & Pimenta, 2011 
Opaliopsis opalina (Dall, 1927)

Family Planaxidae
 Angiola lineata (Costa, 1778)
 Fossarus orbignyi Fischer, 1864

Family Triphoridae
Metaxia excelsa Faber & Moolenbeek, 1991
Metaxia taeniolata (Dall, 1889)
Metaxia rugulosa (C.B. Adams, 1850)
Metaxia prompta Rolán & Fernández-Garcés, 2008
Metaxia gongyloskymnus Fernandes & Pimenta, 2011

Vetigastropoda
Family Areneidae
Arene bairdii (Dall, 1889)
Arene boucheti Leal, 1991
Arene brasiliana (Dall, 1927)
Arene flexispina Leal & Coelho, 1985
Arene lychee Cavallari & Simone, 2018
Arene microforis (Dall, 1889)
Arene riisei Rehder, 1943
Arene variabilis (Dall, 1889)
Arene venusta (Woodring, 1929)

Family Calliostomatidae
 Calliostoma axelolssoni Quinn, 1992
 Calliostoma brunneopictum Quinn, 1992
 Calliostoma bullisi Clench & Turner, 1960
 Calliostoma caribbechinatum Landau, Van Dingenen & Ceulemans, 2017
 Calliostoma carcellesi Clench & Aguayo, 1940
 Calliostoma coppingeri (Smith, 1880)
 Calliostoma depictum Dall, 1927
 Calliostoma gemmosum (Reeve, 1842)
 Calliostoma hassler Clench & Aguayo, 1939
 Calliostoma javanicum (Lamarck, 1822)
 Calliostoma jucundum (Gould, 1849)
 Calliostoma melliferum Cavallari & Simone, 2018 - endemic to Brazil
 Calliostoma militare Ihering, 1907
 Calliostoma moscatelli Quinn, 1992
 Calliostoma nordenskjoldi Strebel, 1908
 Calliostoma rude Quinn, 1992
 Calliostoma tupinamba Dornellas, 2012 - endemic to Brazil
 Calliostoma valkuri Cavallari, Salvador, Dornellas & Simone, 2019
 Calliostoma viscardii Quinn, 1992 
 Calliostoma rota Quinn, 1992
 Calliostoma tenebrosum Quinn, 1992
 Falsimargarita terespira Simone, 2008

Family Chilodontidae
Mirachelus clinocnemus Quinn, 1979

Family Colloniidae
 Homalopoma boffii Marini, 1975 - endemic to Brazil
 Homalopoma linnei (Dall, 1889)

Family Fissurellidae
 Diodora cayenensis (Lamarck, 1822)

Family Haliotidae
 Haliotis aurantium Simone, 1998

Family Margaritidae
Callogaza watsoni Dall, 1881
Gaza compta Simone & Cunha, 2006
Margarites imperialis Simone & Birman, 2006

Family Phasianellidae
Eulithidium affine (C.B. Adams, 1850)

Family Seguenziidae
Ancistrobasis costulata (Watson, 1879)
Carenzia carinata (Jeffreys, 1877)
Carenzia trispinosa (Watson, 1879)
Hadroconus altus (Watson, 1879)
Halystina umberlee Salvador, Cavallari & Simone, 2014
Seguenzia elegans Jeffreys, 1885
Seguenzia formosa Jeffreys, 1876
Seguenzia triteia Salvador, Cavallari & Simone, 2014

Family Solariellidae
Bathymophila euspira (Dall, 1881)
Lamellitrochus cancapae (Vilvens & Swinnen, 2007)
Lamellitrochus carinatus Quinn, 1991
Lamellitrochus pourtalesi (Clench & Aguayo, 1939)
Solariella carvalhoi Lopes & Cardoso, 1958
Solariella quinni Barros & Pereira in Barros et al., 2008
Suavotrochus lubricus (Dall, 1881)

Family Tegulidae
Agathistoma nordestinum Dornellas, Gabroski, Hellberg & Lotufo, 2022 - endemic to Brazil
Agathistoma hotessierianum (d'Orbigny, 1842)
Agathistoma patagonicum (d'Orbigny, 1835)
Agathistoma viridulum (Gmelin, 1791)

Family Trochidae
Halistylus columna (Dall, 1890)

Bivalvia

Species of bivalves include:

Family Anomiidae

Pododesmus rudis

Family Arcidae

Anadara brasiliana
Anadara chemnitzii
Bathyarca pectunculoides
Lunarca ovalis

Family Donacidae

Donax gemmula
Donax hanleyanus
Iphigenia brasiliana

Family Glycymerididae

Glycymeris longior
Glycymeris pectinata

Family Limopsidae

Limopsis aurita
Limopsis minuta
Limopsis davinae

Family Ostreidae

Ostrea puelchana

Family Pectinidae

Aequipecten tehuelchus
Euvola ziczac
Leptopecten bavayi

Family Philobryidae

Cosa brasiliensis

Family Propeamussiidae

Parvamussium pourtalesianum
Cyclopecten nanus
Cyclopecten hoskynsi (Forbes, 1844)

Family Semelidae

Abra brasiliana
Semele casali
Semele nuculoides
Semele proficua
Semele purpurascens

Family Tellinidae

Tellina iheringi
Tellina listeri
Tellina martinicensis
Tellina punicea
Tellina lineata
Tellina trinitatis
Tellina nitens
Tellina versicolor
Tellina exerythra
Tellina gibber
Tellina diantha
Tellina sandix
Macoma constricta
Macoma cleryana
Macoma uruguayensis

Family Veneridae

Amiantis purpuratus
Anomalocardia brasiliana
Callista maculata
Chione cancellata
Chione paphia
Chione pubera
Chione subrostrata
Cyclinella tenuis
Dosinia concentrica
Gouldia cerina
Pitar fulminatus
Pitar rostratus
Protothaca pectorina
Tivela mactroides (Born, 1778)
Transenpitar americana
Ventricolaria rigida

Polyplacophora

Species of polyplacophorans include:

Family Acanthochitonidae

Acanthochitona ciroi
Acanthochitona pygmaea
Acanthochitona rhodeus

Family Chaetopleuridae
Chaetopleura angulata
Chaetopleura apiculata
Chaetopleura asperrima
Chaetopleura isabellei (d'Orbigny, 1841)
Chaetopleura sowerbiana
Chaetopleura janeirensis
Connexochiton moreirai

Family Ischnochitonidae

Ischnochiton aidae
Ischnochiton dorsuosus
Ischnochiton edwini
Ischnochiton erythronotus
Ischnochiton hartmeyeri
Ischnochiton lopesi
Ischnochiton marcusi
Ischnochiton pectinatus
Ischnochiton striolatus
Stenoplax boogii (Haddon, 1886)
Stenoplax kempfi
Stenoplax purpurascens

Family Tonicellidae

Lepidochitona rosea Kaas, 1972

See also
 List of non-marine molluscs of Brazil

Lists of molluscs of surrounding countries:
 List of marine molluscs of French Guiana
 List of marine molluscs of Uruguay

References

External links
 —ConchasBrasil.org: Brazilian species of molluscs

Marine
Molluscs, marine
Brazil
Brazil, Marine
Brazil